The Georgia national under-20 rugby union team is Georgia's junior national team.

Georgia defeated Portugal 44-14 in the final of the European Under-19 Championship to qualify for the 2015 World Rugby Under 20 Trophy. In 2015 they were promoted to World Rugby Under 20 Championship after winning the 2015 World Rugby Under 20 Trophy and in 2017, Georgia will host the World Rugby Under 20 Championship.

Management
 Ilia Maisuradze - Head Coach
 Lado Kilasonia, Zurab Amonashvili and Gaga Gureshidze - Assistant Coaches
 Irakli Chkonia, Giorgi Nadareishvili and Anthony Brett- Strength & Conditioning
 Liam Robinson and Irakli Shaorshidze - Physiotherapists
 Vakhtang Tsiklauri - Team Doctor
 Davit Ramishvili - Video Analyst

Wins against Tier 1 nations

Current squad
Georgian Squad for U20 Summer Series 2022

Overall

See also
 Georgia national rugby union team

References

External links
 Georgia Rugby Union Official Site

under20
European national under-20 rugby union teams